The YÖS Examination is an entrance examination designed for foreign students who wish to enroll in higher education institutions in Turkey.

Universities conduct their own versions of the exam. The test is open only for students wishing to enroll in undergraduate programs. Enrolled students who seek a transfer as well as those who wish to follow postgraduate programs apply directly to the institutions of their choice.

The YÖS Examination is composed of three tests:
 Mathematics and problems
 Intelligence
 Geometry
Approximately 9,200 candidates take the YÖS Examination annually.

See also 

 ÖSYM

References

External links
 Çanakkale Onsekiz Mart Üniversitesi 
 
YOS exam introduction in Afkarnews
Jamejamonline for YOS exam introduction- How to apply in turkey Universities 
Tabnak News - How to Success in turkey via YOS exam
Namnak- YOS exam

Education in Turkey
Education policy
Standardized tests in Turkey